Marshall Bridges (June 2, 1931 – September 3, 1990) was an American professional baseball player who pitched in the Major Leagues from 1959 to 1965 for the St. Louis Cardinals, Cincinnati Reds, New York Yankees and Washington Senators.

After spending time with the Negro league Memphis Red Sox, then bouncing around the minor leagues for six seasons, he broke into the majors with St. Louis in the mid-season of 1959, posting a 6–3 won-lost record and a 4.26 earned run average, striking out 76 hitters in 76 innings. He might have pitched more in his first couple seasons, but sore heels gave him trouble. Used almost exclusively as a relief pitcher throughout his seven-season career, Bridges' best season came in  while a member of the Yankees, anchoring the world champions' relief staff while recording a team-leading 18 saves to go with an 8–4 record and a 3.14 earned run average. However, that same season he also became the first American League pitcher to give up a World Series grand slam home run when Chuck Hiller of the San Francisco Giants got hold of one in Game 4.

One of the era's most colorful characters, Bridges was nicknamed "Sheriff" and "Fox."  He was known as a teller of tall tales and an instigator or victim of elaborate practical jokes. During 1963 spring training in a Fort Lauderdale, Florida, bar, a disagreement between Bridges and a female patron resulted in her shooting him in the leg. The resulting negative publicity annoyed the image-conscious Yankee brass and may have been a major factor in them selling his contract to last-place Washington on November 30, 1963. His recovery from the gunshot wound was apparently complete, but Bridges never regained the dominance that he had shown in 1962.

The 1965 Senators were Bridges' last stop in his MLB career. His lifetime totals include a won/lost record of 23–15, 25 saves, an ERA of 3.75 and 302 strikeouts in 345 innings pitched.

Bridges died of cancer on September 3, 1990, at the age of 59 at the University of Mississippi Medical Center in Jackson.

References

External links

1931 births
1990 deaths
African-American baseball players
Amarillo Gold Sox players
Austin Senators players
Baseball players from Jackson, Mississippi
Beaumont Exporters players
Cincinnati Reds players
Danville Leafs players
Deaths from cancer in Mississippi
Hawaii Islanders players
Jersey City Jerseys players
Major League Baseball pitchers
Memphis Red Sox players
New York Yankees players
Rochester Red Wings players
Sacramento Solons players
St. Louis Cardinals players
Sioux City Soos players
Topeka Hawks players
Toronto Maple Leafs (International League) players
Washington Senators (1961–1971) players
20th-century African-American sportspeople